It has been estimated that before European settlement, forests in the United States mainland, covered nearly .

As of 2016, roughly 36.21% (about one-third of the U.S.) is forested. Excluding the U.S. territories, forested land in the U.S. covers roughly 818,814,000 acres (3,313,622 square kilometers). As of 2005, the United States ranked seventh in the rate of loss of its old growth forests.

Current coverage 

While total forest area has been relatively stable for the last 100 years, there have been significant regional shifts in the area and composition of the nation's forests. Reversion of marginal farmland in the east, large scale planting in the South, and fire suppression have contributed to increases in forest area. Urbanization, conversion to agriculture, reservoir construction, and natural disasters have been major factors contributing to loss of forests."

These are largely in private ownership (83%). Most public forest land is held by four Federal agencies (United States Forest Service, Bureau of Land Management, National Park Service, Fish and Wildlife Service) as well as numerous state, county, and municipal government organizations."

Major uses of forests include timber production, recreation, hunting, fishing, watershed and fisheries protection, wildlife habitat and biodiversity protection, and gathering nontimber products such as berries, mushrooms, and medicinal plants."

There are boreal forests in Alaska. Forests in Hawaii and the U.S. territories are tropical.  

The most heavily-forested regions of the U.S. are Maine, New Hampshire, American Samoa, the Northern Mariana Islands and West Virginia; the least heavily forested regions are North Dakota, Nebraska, and South Dakota.

The U.S. had a 2018 Forest Landscape Integrity Index mean score of 6.65/10, ranking it 67th globally out of 172 countries.

Environmental issues

Deforestation

Invasive species

Projects have been undertaken to remove invasive species from forests in the U.S.; for example, in the U.S. Minor Outlying Islands, rats were successfully eradicated in the tropical forest on Palmyra Atoll.

Wildfire

Protected areas

National forests

See also
 Assisted migration of forests in North America
François André Michaux, a botanist noted for his work on the trees found in America
 Hawaiian tropical rainforests
 List of U.S. National Forests
 National Park Service
 Senate Committee on Forest Reservations and the Protection of Game
 United States Forest Service
 Forests of Mexico
 Forests of Canada

Notes

References

External links

Old-Growth Forest Definitions from U.S. Regional Ecosystem Office
Discover The Forest